Wolfgang Gruber (born 22 February 1953) is a German boxer. He competed in the men's light heavyweight event at the 1976 Summer Olympics, defeating Frederick Sabat of Kenya before losing to Sixto Soria of Cuba.

References

External links
 

1953 births
Living people
German male boxers
Olympic boxers of West Germany
Boxers at the 1976 Summer Olympics
People from Worms, Germany
Light-heavyweight boxers
Sportspeople from Rhineland-Palatinate